Linda de Vries (born 4 February 1988) is a Dutch former speed skater. She finished third in the Women's 1500 metres event at the 2012 World Single Distance Speed Skating Championships and twice (in 2012 and 2013) fourth at the World All-Round Speed Skating Championships.

Her parents, Margriet Pomper and Jan de Vries, were also speed skaters.

Records

She is currently in 26th position in the adelskalender.

References

1988 births
Living people
Dutch female speed skaters
People from Assen
World Single Distances Speed Skating Championships medalists
21st-century Dutch women
Sportspeople from Drenthe